Jeyran-e Olya (also Romanized as Jeyrān-e ‘Olyā) is a village in Sarajuy-ye Sharqi Rural District, Saraju District, Maragheh County, East Azerbaijan Province, Iran. At the 2006 census, its population was 155, in 25 families.

References 

Towns and villages in Maragheh County